Harain-e Olya (also Romanized as Harā’īn-e ‘Olyā, Harā’īn Owlyā, and Haraīyan Ūlīya; also known as Harā’īn and Harāyen) is a village in Shahidabad Rural District, Central District, Avaj County, Qazvin Province, Iran. At the 2006 census, its population was 1,112, in 277 families.

References 

Populated places in Avaj County